Seo Dong-won, a Korean name consisting of the family name Seo and the masculine given name Dong-won, may refer to:

 Seo Dong-won (footballer born 1973)
 Seo Dong-won (footballer born 1975)